The 1986 FIBA Club World Cup took place at Córdoba and Buenos Aires, Argentina. It was the 20th edition of the FIBA Intercontinental Cup for men's basketball clubs. It was the third edition of the competition that was held under the name of FIBA Club World Cup.

Participants

Group stage

Group A 

Day 1, September 9 1986, Buenos Aires

|}

Day 2, September 10 1986, Buenos Aires

|}

Day 3, September 11 1986, Buenos Aires

|}

Group B 

Day 1, September 9 1986, Córdoba

|}

Day 2, September 10 1986, Córdoba

|}

Day 3, September 11 1986, Córdoba

|}

Places 5-8

Semi finals 
September 13 1986, Buenos Aires

|}

7th & 5th place games 
September 14 1986, Buenos Aires

|}

Places 1-4

Semi finals 
September 13 1986, Buenos Aires

|}

3rd place game 
September 14 1986, Buenos Aires

|}

Final

Final standings

External links
1986 World Cup for Champion Clubs 

 

1986
1986
1986 in Argentine sport
International basketball competitions hosted by Argentina
1986–87 in South American basketball
1986–87 in American basketball
1986–87 in European basketball